Fluvanna County High School is a public school about two miles west of  Palmyra, Virginia on Virginia State Route 53. It opened in 1934 as one of the first county consolidated high schools in the U.S. Commonwealth of Virginia. The school is noted for its unique nickname, the Flying Flucos.

History
The original Fluvanna County High School was located in Carysbrook, Virginia. The Carysbrook campus was renovated in the 1980s and now serves as the Offices of the Fluvanna County Social Services Department, and a community center with an auditorium for performing arts. The Fluvanna County Department of Parks and Recreation administers the original school gym and playing fields.

The Fluvanna County School Division integrated in 1969 and the high school became known as Fluvanna Senior High School (grades 10 -12). The former Abrams High School became Fluvanna Junior High School (grades 8 & 9).

In the summer of 1976, a new Fluvanna County High School opened adjacent to the old Abrams High School (Fluvanna Jr. High) near Palmyra. This school campus, now Fluvanna Middle School, has had many additions constructed and renovations since the original construction in 1975.

In 2009 the Fluvanna County School Board approved the building of a new Fluvanna County High School on the Pleasant Grove property on the Rivanna River near Palmyra.  The new school at Pleasant Grove (Palmyra, Virginia) opened in 2012.

Flying Flucos

In 1948 Fluvanna County was one of the few teams in Virginia that was playing high school football. The 1949 Fluvanna County High School Yearbook, the Fluvannual, makes first reference to the nickname Flying Flucos. As written in the yearbook, "Our next game on November 12 was the pride of the 'Flying Flucos'. Rated as underdogs in this game between Fluvanna and Manchester, the Flucos racked up a touchdown, a safety, and an extra point, to edge Manchester 9 - 6. This is the team, incidentally, that led to the name, 'Flying Flucos.' "  Prior to this a newspaper article was written that referenced "The Flying Men of Flu.Co." (an attempt to abbreviate Fluvanna County)  The students at Fluvanna County HS embraced 'Flying Flucos' and it has been the nickname ever since.

The first attempt to create a visual image of the Flying Flucos mascot was 'Mercury (mythology) Winged Sandals that appeared in the 1950s - 1960s.   The Winged sandals were said to be made of imperishable gold and they flew the gods as swift as any bird. Students at version 2 of the school (now middle school), adjoining S C Abrams school, referred to the gym as the 'Shoebox', while anchoring the school's morning television show.  The Old English script Flying 'F' with wings is now the Flying Fluco logo. Over the years many efforts to make a super hero type character the Flying Fluco mascot were attempted but all never gathered much support.  Recently a caped 'Flucoman' mascot has appeared.

Activities

Athletics and activities
The Flying Flucos participated in the Virginia State High School League (VHSL) Group 'A' James River District during the 1970s and 1980s with traditional rivals Buckingham, Goochland, Amelia, Cumberland, Prince Edward, Powhatan and Lunenburg Central. In the 1990s as enrollment for the high school grew, the Flying Flucos moved to the 'AA' Jefferson District with Charlottesville, Orange, William Monroe, Goochland, Powhatan, Louisa, Monticello, and Western Albemarle.  The Flying Flucos continued to schedule traditional rivals, such as Buckingham, as schedules allowed.  Fluvanna's VHSL classification is now 'Division 3, Region 3C' offering {fall season} cheerleading, competition cheerleading, cross country (boys and girls), football, golf, volleyball, {winter season} basketball (boys and girls), cheerleading, indoor track & field (boys and girls), swim & dive (boys and girls), wrestling, {spring season} baseball, lacrosse (boys and girls), outdoor track & field (boys and girls), soccer (boys and girls), softball, and tennis (boys and girls). Also under the VHSL's guidance, Fluvanna County competes in forensics and scholastic bowl.

The football stadium at the Middle School was named "Costello Stadium" in 1981.The Pleasant Grove football field, the current field, is named 'Phil Browning Field'.   

The basketball program won state championships during the 1980s and early 1990s to include the boys Group 'A' title in 1989 and 1990 as well as a Group AA Div. 3 Final Four appearances in 2012.

In 2019, the Flying Flucos Baseball team won the 3A State Baseball title.

Marching band
The Fluvanna County Marching Flucos won first place in the USSBA National Band Competition in Single-A bands in 2006.

Notable alumni
 Chris Daughtry - Contestant on American Idol Season 5. Created the band Daughtry.

References

External links
School Website
Athletics Website
Fluvanna Band Website

Schools in Fluvanna County, Virginia
Public high schools in Virginia
Educational institutions established in 1934
1934 establishments in Virginia